Sione Takitaki (born June 8, 1995) is an American football linebacker for the Cleveland Browns of the National Football League (NFL). He played college football at BYU and was drafted by the Browns in the third round of the 2019 NFL Draft.

College career
Takitaki played college football at BYU from 2014 to 2018.  In four seasons with the team, he totaled 237 tackles, including 32.5 tackles for a loss, with 14.5 sacks.  As a senior, he served as a team captain and led the Cougars with 118 tackles.

Professional career

Takitaki was drafted by the Cleveland Browns in the third round with the 80th overall pick in the 2019 NFL Draft.

In Week 11 of the 2020 season against the Philadelphia Eagles, Takitaki intercepted a pass thrown by Carson Wentz and returned it 50 yards for a touchdown during the 22–17 win. This was Takitaki's first career interception and touchdown. Takitaki was placed on the reserve/COVID-19 list by the Browns on November 25, 2020, and activated on December 4. In Week 14 against the Baltimore Ravens on Monday Night Football, Takitaki recorded his first career sack on Lamar Jackson during the 47–42 loss.

Takitaki produced the biggest play of his career that season in the AFC Wildcard game against the Pittsburgh Steelers, intercepting a Ben Roethlisberger pass with 3:16 left in the fourth quarter to seal a 48–37 victory.

Takitaki entered the 2022 season as a starting linebacker alongside Anthony Walker Jr. and Jeremiah Owusu-Koramoah. He suffered a knee injury in Week 13 and was placed on injured reserve on December 7, 2022.

On March 16, 2023, Takitaki signed a one-year contract extension with the Browns.

Personal life
Takitaki, of Tongan descent, was born to father Vaimaua and mother Fissipeau, the youngest of a family of seven children with four sisters and two brothers.
 Takitaki married Alyssa Penney on June 14, 2016, in Sacramento, California.

His father died when he was 14. He was raised in the Church of Jesus Christ of Latter-day Saints, with his faith being one of the reasons he chose to attend BYU.

Career statistics

Regular season

Postseason

References

External links
Cleveland Browns bio
BYU Cougars bio

1995 births
Living people
American people of Tongan descent
American football linebackers
BYU Cougars football players
Cleveland Browns players
People from Colton, California
Players of American football from California
Sportspeople from San Bernardino County, California
Latter Day Saints from California